Miki Eleonora Berenyi (born 18 March 1967) is an English singer, songwriter, and guitarist best known as a member of the alternative rock band Lush and currently a member of Piroshka.

Biography 

Berenyi was born in Chelsea, London to a Japanese mother, actress Yasuko Nagazumi, and Hungarian father, Ivan Berenyi. She is also a second cousin of the Japanese singer-songwriter Cornelius.

At the age of 14, Berenyi met friend and future bandmate Emma Anderson while both were students at Queen's College. They became interested in music and together published a music fanzine, Alphabet Soup (which lasted for five issues). Berenyi first played bass with the band the Bugs. In 1987, Berenyi studied English literature at North London Polytechnic, where she met drummer Chris Acland and singer  Meriel Barham. Along with Anderson, they decided to form their own band, originally called the Baby Machines. Bassist Steve Rippon joined and they changed their name to Lush. When Barham left, "the remaining members of Lush placed ads in local papers looking for Barham's replacement, but they couldn't find the singer they wanted and Berenyi took over the vocals".
 
From 1987 until 1996, she played with Lush, releasing several albums, singles and music videos and toured extensively through the UK, North America, Japan, Australia and other countries. She and Acland also collaborated with members of Cocteau Twins and Moose, releasing one song in 1991 under the name Lillies.

Lush officially announced their breakup in February 1998, following Acland's death by suicide in October 1996.

After Lush split, Berenyi appeared on The Rentals' album Seven More Minutes (1999). She also contributed vocals to a remix of a Flat 7 track by Robin Guthrie (who also produced Lush's early work) and appeared on Seinking Ships' debut album, Museum Quality Capture, released in 2010.

When asked if she missed anything about her time in Lush, Berenyi stated, "I miss the excitement and energy of playing live and the camaraderie of touring—being with the band and crew in a foreign country is like going on holiday with your mates but even more fun because it’s free." She also said, "I enjoyed being in the band immensely, I’m glad I did it".

Berenyi later worked for a magazine as a sub-editor and did not perform for many years. She explained: "I was never a proper guitarist—only in the context of Lush. I played the guitar to write songs on and to play live".

Lush, including Berenyi, announced a reunion on 28 September 2015, with former Elastica drummer Justin Welch taking over for Acland. They toured extensively throughout 2016 and released an EP of new material; "Blind Spot" in April of that year. Bassist Phil King left the band in October 2016 and as a consequence Lush played their final farewell gig, with Michael Conroy of Modern English on bass at Manchester Academy on 25 November 2016.

In September 2018, Berenyi announced that she had formed a new band, Piroshka, with Welch, Conroy and former Moose member K.J. "Moose" McKillop. Berenyi and partner McKillop have two children. Their debut album, Brickbat, was released by Bella Union on 15 February 2019.

In April 2022, Berenyi announced the release of her memoir Fingers Crossed, due out in September. Berenyi is set to do a series of live Q&As to coincide with the release of the book from October 2022, including at Rough Trade Records London, at Lincoln Drill Hall in conversation with Guy Mankowski,and at IINSIDE, Manchester in conversation with John Robb (musician) of Louder Than War.

Influences 
In 2020, Berenyi cited The Shangri-Las as an influence for their harmonies and lyrics. She has also cited ABBA and The Smiths as influences.

References

1967 births
Living people
Singers from London
People educated at Queen's College, London
Alumni of the University of North London
Women rock singers
English rock guitarists
English women guitarists
English people of Hungarian descent
English people of Japanese descent
English rock singers
Shoegaze musicians
21st-century English women singers
21st-century English singers
Lush (band) members